Tang-e Riz (also Romanized as Tang-e Rīz and Tang Rīz) is a village in Par Zeytun Rural District, Meymand District, Firuzabad County, Fars Province, Iran. At the 2006 census, its population was 302, in 62 families.

References 

Populated places in Firuzabad County